The Federal Territory Mosque is a mosque in Kuala Lumpur, Malaysia. It is located near MATRADE complex and the Federal Government Complex off Jalan Duta, in Segambut district.

History
The Kuala Lumpur Mosque was constructed between 1998 and 2000. It is situated on a five hectare site near the Government Office Complex along Jalan Duta. The Wilayah Persekutuan (Federal Territory) Mosque was opened to the public on 25 October 2000 and was officiated by the 12th Yang di-Pertuan Agong, Tuanku Syed Sirajuddin ibni Almarhum Syed Putra Jamalulail. It is the 44th mosque built by the Government within the city limits. The mosque can accommodate 17,000 worshippers at any one time.

Architecture
The mosque's design is a blend of Ottoman and Malay architectural styles, heavily influenced by the Blue Mosque in Istanbul, Turkey. It has 22 domes made from a composite material of glass fibre fabric mixed with epoxy resin to make it durable and light.

See also
 Islam in Malaysia

References

Mosques in Kuala Lumpur
2000 establishments in Malaysia
Mosques completed in 2000
Mosque buildings with domes